The Snakes & Arrows Tour was a concert tour by Canadian rock band Rush to promote the studio album Snakes & Arrows. The first leg of the tour began on June 13, 2007 in Atlanta and concluded on October 29, 2007 at Hartwall Arena in Helsinki, Finland. The 2008 portion of the tour started on April 11, 2008 in San Juan, Puerto Rico at José Miguel Agrelot Coliseum and ended on July 24, 2008 in Noblesville, Indiana at the Verizon Wireless Amphitheatre. The tour was Rush's most successful to date, grossing nearly $65 million. At 114 shows, it is Rush's second-longest tour, after the Hemispheres tour back in 

Rush released the double live album Snakes & Arrows Live on April 15, 2008, documenting the 2007 leg. It contains the entire 2007 setlist recorded over two days, October 16–17, in Rotterdam, Netherlands. The album features the song "Distant Early Warning" in place of "Summertime Blues".

During this tour, Rush once again used their connections to add humor to their performances. "The Larger Bowl (A Pantoum)" featured an intro from SCTV's own Bob and Doug McKenzie, while "Tom Sawyer" was preceded by an intro from South Park characters Cartman, Stan, Kyle, and Kenny.

Performance changes
This tour differed from previous Rush tours in an increase of new material played (nine songs compared to the more usual four or five)  and the reintroduction of songs that have not been played for decades (for example "Circumstances", last played when the band was touring for 1978's Hemispheres, and "A Passage to Bangkok", which was last played in its entirety on the Moving Pictures Warm-Up tour and included as a cut on 1981's double-live album Exit... Stage Left). The first leg also marked the first time "Entre Nous" from Permanent Waves was performed live. Some of the older songs (e.g. "Digital Man" from Signals) were shortened.

Neil Peart's drum solo underwent changes. The big band ending, which on previous tours featured Peart's performance of "One O'Clock Jump" by Count Basie, instead incorporated a portion of "Cotton Tail", a song he recorded with the Buddy Rich Band on the tribute Burning For Buddy, Vol. 1. The marimba section from "Pieces of Eight" and the tribal excerpt piece from "Scars" were also dropped.

2007 leg setlist

Set 1 

 "Limelight" 
 "Digital Man"
 "Entre Nous"
 "Mission"
 "Freewill"
 "The Main Monkey Business"
 "The Larger Bowl (A Pantoum)"
 "Secret Touch"
 "Circumstances"
 "Between the Wheels"
 "Dreamline"

Set 2

 "Far Cry"
 "Workin' Them Angels"
 "Armor and Sword"
 "Spindrift"
 "The Way the Wind Blows"
 "Subdivisions"
 "Natural Science"
 "Witch Hunt"
 "Malignant Narcissism"
 "De Slagwerker" (Neil Peart drum solo)
 "Hope"
 "Summertime Blues" or "Distant Early Warning" (alternated starting on July 4, 2007 and permanently added to the setlist for the entire European leg)
 "The Spirit of Radio"
 "Tom Sawyer"

Encore:

 "One Little Victory"
 "A Passage to Bangkok"
 "YYZ"

2008 leg setlist

Set 1 

 "Limelight"
 "Digital Man"
 "Ghost of a Chance"
 "Mission"
 "Freewill"
 "The Main Monkey Business"
 "The Larger Bowl (A Pantoum)"
 "Red Barchetta"
 "The Trees"
 "Between the Wheels"
 "Dreamline"

Set 2:

 "Far Cry"
 "Workin' Them Angels"
 "Armor and Sword"
 "Spindrift"
 "The Way the Wind Blows"
 "Subdivisions"
 "Natural Science"
 "Witch Hunt"
 "Malignant Narcissism"
 "De Slagwerker" (Neil Peart drum solo)
 "Hope"
 "The Spirit of Radio"
 "2112"I."Overture"II."The Temples of Syrinx"
 "Tom Sawyer"

Encore:

 "One Little Victory"
 "A Passage to Bangkok"
 "YYZ"

Tour dates

References

Bibliography
 Daly and Hansen. Rush: Wandering the Face of the Earth: The Official Touring History. Insight Editions, 2019. 

Rush (band) concert tours
2007 concert tours
2008 concert tours